Sagittaria pygmaea, commonly known as the  dwarf arrowhead or pygmy arrowhead, is an aquatic plant species. It is native to Japan (including the Ryukyu Islands), Korea, Taiwan, Thailand, Vietnam, Bhutan and China (Anhui, Fujian, Guangdong, Guangxi, Guizhou, Hainan, Henan, Hubei, Hunan, Jiangsu, Jiangxi, Shaanxi, Shandong, Sichuan, Yunnan, Zhejiang).

Sagittaria pygmaea grows in shallow water in marshes, channels and rice paddies. It is a perennial herb producing by means of stolons.

References

pygmaea
Flora of Taiwan
Flora of China
Flora of East Himalaya
Flora of Thailand
Flora of Vietnam
Flora of Korea
Flora of Japan
Flora of the Ryukyu Islands
Freshwater plants
Edible plants
Plants described in 1865